"Cut It Out" is a song by the Australian alternative band The Go-Betweens that was released as the second single their fifth studio album Tallulah. It was released as a 7" and 12" vinyl single on the Beggars Banquet label in the United Kingdom on 11 May 1987, with "Time in the Desert" as the B-side.

"Cut It Out", was recorded with producer Craig Leon in London in late December 1986. "Time in the Desert" was then recorded in the second week in January, with producer Richard Preston.

Details
Forster described the song as, "a riffy thing that we would jam on backstage; it had a choppy, mid-60s R&B feel to it." Unhappy with the recording, Forster wrote that it is, "the worst song in the Go-Betweens catalogue."

Critical reception
Ian Cranna in his review of the song in Smash Hits states "surprise galore with a most un-folky laboured guitar and drum machine "riff", great backing vocalists and swirling organ followed by a contrasting heavenly girlie chorus. It's a wonderful piece of work but doomed as a single because those dullards at Radio One will never play anything so adventurous." John Aizlewood however was less enthusiastic in his review commenting "Poor little Go-Betweens, always searching for the hit in the haystack. Never finding it. This isn't the hit, beautiful, stately and dignified though it is. 'Spring Rain' was the hit and that wasn't, if you follow."

Jason McNeil in Popmatters believes that the song "follows a different path, yet the chorus is pure gold, drawing the listener in again." Sounds felt the single was a "mildly disappointing" follow up to "Right Here, but described it as, "A swaggering stomp that bursts a bouquet of lyrical barbed wire over an expensive sounding bass sound and a sharply punctuating backbeat."

In his review of Tallulah, at Allmusic, Thom Jurek describes "the nearly funky organ and bass swirl of "Cut It Out," is unlike any Go-Betweens song before or since."

In David Nichols' book, The Go-Betweens he describes "Cut It Out" as representing "very neatly what striving for commercial success was doing to the Go-Betweens." He goes on to state "It is disjointed, mechanical, and trite, and while in some cases such attributes can combine to make winning pop music, 'Cut It Out' is just a slender tune battered to death by studio effects."

Track listing

Release history

Credits
The Go-Betweens
 Amanda Brown — violin, backing vocals
 Grant McLennan — lead vocals, guitar
 Lindy Morrison — drums
 Robert Forster — backing vocals, guitar
 Robert Vickers — bass

Production
 Producer – Craig Leon ("Cut It Out")
 Assistant Producer – Cassell Webb ("Cut It Out")
 Engineer – Sid Wells ("Cut It Out")
 Producer — Richard Preston ("Time in the Desert")

References

External links
 [ "Cut It Out"] @ AllMusic 
 "Cut It Out" @ MusicBrainz
 "Cut It Out" @ Discogs 
 Video

1987 singles
The Go-Betweens songs
1987 songs
Beggars Banquet Records singles
Songs written by Grant McLennan
Songs written by Robert Forster (musician)